Notopeplum cossignani is a species of sea snail, a marine gastropod mollusk in the family Volutidae.

Original description
 Poppe G.T. (1999) New Volutidae from the Indian Ocean and Australia. Malacologia Mostra Mondiala 99: 3-7. [May 1999] page(s): 4.

References

External links
 Worms Link

Volutidae